Festo is a German automation company based in Esslingen am Neckar, Germany. Festo produces and sells pneumatic and electrical control systems and drive technology for factories and process automation. Festo Didactic also offers industrial education and consultation services and is one of the sponsors and partners of the WorldSkills Mechatronics Competitions. Sales subsidiaries, distribution centres and factories of Festo are located in 61 countries worldwide. The company was named after its founders Albert Fezer and Gottlieb Stoll.

Animal robots

Festo is known for making moving robots that move like animals, such as the seagull-like SmartBird, jellyfish, butterflies and kangaroos. In 2018 they also added a flying fox and a rolling spider to the list. Festo calls their Bionic Flying Fox an “ultra-lightweight flying object with intelligent kinematics.”

See also
 BionicKangaroo
 Robotino

References

External links
 Bloomberg profile
 Official website
 Official website Festo Didactic
 Festo GB (UK) Website
 Festo US Website

Engineering companies of Germany
Robotics companies of Germany
Manufacturing companies established in 1925
Companies based in Baden-Württemberg
1925 establishments in Germany
German brands